Macorix may refer to:

The Macorix people, a Neo-Taino people of the Dominican Republic
Macorix (RM-21), a Dominican Navy tug in commission from 1972 to 1986 which previously had served in the United States Navy as